Placebo is the second studio album from Japanese girl group ASP. It was released on January 5, 2022, by WACK and consists of thirteen tracks.

Track listing

Charts

References

2022 albums
Japanese-language albums